Christmas Caroling is a 1984 compilation album by Ray Conniff, consisting of tracks recorded between 1959 and 1965 and previously released on his three Christmas albums.

Track listing

References

Ray Conniff albums
1984 compilation albums
1984 Christmas albums
Christmas albums by American artists
Christmas compilation albums
Columbia Records Christmas albums
Pop Christmas albums